These are lists of governors of prefectures of Japan.

Many prefectures are missing.

 List of prefectural governors in Japan (current)
 List of governors of Aichi Prefecture
 List of governors of Hokkaido Prefecture
 List of governors of Hiroshima Prefecture
 List of governors of Ibaraki Prefecture
 List of governors of Ishikawa Prefecture
 List of governors of Kanagawa Prefecture
 List of governors of Kumamoto Prefecture
 List of governors of Kyoto Prefecture
 List of governors of Miyagi Prefecture
 List of governors of Nagano Prefecture
 List of governors of Niigata Prefecture
 List of governors of Okayama Prefecture
 List of governors of Okinawa Prefecture
 List of governors of Osaka Prefecture
 List of governors of Saga Prefecture
 List of governors of Saitama Prefecture
 List of governors of Shiga Prefecture

Lists of political office-holders in Japan